Horian or Haryan or Hariyan may refer to:

Haryan, Hamadan
Horian, Qazvin